Symington Yard is the largest rail classification yard of the Canadian National Railway, and one of the largest rail yards in the world. The intermodal facility is located next to the Windsor Park area of Winnipeg, Manitoba.

Built in 1962 to replace Transcona and Fort Rouge, and named for former CNR Director Herbert James Symington (1881–1965), it can store 7,000 cars and handles 3,000 cars per day.

Yard incidents

 December 15, 1983 — two sets of locomotives collide in the Yard killing a CP engineer
 February 2, 1990 — eleven cars jackknifed and derailed at the bottom of the hump

See also
 MacMillan Yard

References

Canadian National Railway facilities
Rail infrastructure in Manitoba
Rail infrastructure in Winnipeg
Transport in Winnipeg
1962 establishments in Manitoba
Transcona, Winnipeg
Saint Boniface, Winnipeg